|}

The Down Royal Mares Novice Hurdle is a Grade 3 National Hunt hurdle race in Ireland which is open to mares aged four years or older. It is run at Down Royal over a distance of 2 miles and half a furlong (2 miles and 100 yards, or 3,310 metres). The race is for novice hurdlers, and it is scheduled to take place each year in late October or early November.

The race was first run in 2002 and was awarded Grade 3 status in 2007.

Records
Leading jockey since 2002 (5 wins):
 Davy Russell –  Laetitia (2012), Megans Joy (2007), Tramp Stamp (2008), Just Janice (2017), Daylight Katie (2019)

Leading trainer since 2002 (4 wins):
 Willie Mullins -  	Morning Run (2014), Listen Dear (2015), Airlie Beach (2016), Sancta Simona (2018)

Winners

See also 
 Horse racing in Ireland
 List of Irish National Hunt races

References
Racing Post:

National Hunt races in Ireland
National Hunt hurdle races
Down Royal Racecourse
Horse races in Northern Ireland
Recurring sporting events established in 2002
2002 establishments in Northern Ireland